Chertkovo railway station is a former railway station located in Chertkovo, Rostov oblast, Russia. It is 325 km down-line from Rostov-Glavny and was situated between Zorinovka and Sheptukhovka on the Moscow — Rostov-on-Don line until 2017 when a bypass between Zhuravka and Millerovo was completed. The station is located at the Ukrainian border just opposite to the Ukrainian village of Milove.

History 

The station was being laid on 14 August 1869 with the construction of the south section of the South Eastern Railway near the border between Don Host Oblast and Kharkov Governorate. The station was named for ataman Mikhail Chertkov who petitioned to construct this railway. Village of Chertkovo was founded due to construction of the self-named railway station.

In 1873 the second class station Chertkovo had a one-storey stone station building, one passenger and two cargo platforms, locomotive depot for 12 steam locomotives, reservoir for water, two stone and eight wooden constructions, bathhouse, laundry and other warehouses. Buffets, bookstall and newsstand worked  on the station. The railway line was fully equipped with the latest technology. Wireless telegraphs of the Markoni Company were exploited in Chertkovo. In the early 1900s Chertkovo was a small workers' settlement where there were a church, drinking establishment and bunkhouse. At that time construction began of a hospital. Chertkovo had only one secondary school and college.

The opening ceremony of the bust of Mikhail Chertkov took place at the square front of the station in August 2009. The event was held in conjunction by the 140-year anniversary of Chertkovo.

Services 
Until the Russo-Ukrainian War Chertkovo was a station for long-distance and suburban trains operated by Russian Railways. The most common destinations were: Rostov-on-Don, Moscow, Adler, Novorossiysk, Anapa, Kislovodsk, Yeysk, Saint Petersburg, Stavropol, Sukhumi, Vladikavkaz. The average stopping times of passenger trains were of about 2 minutes. But in December 2017 the Russian Railways had switched all long-distance trains traveling southwards to the new Zhuravka-Millerovo line to circumvent Ukraine and as a by-product Chertkovo. In 2018 also local services were terminated and the station was liquidated in 2019.

Zhuravka – Millerovo bypass
Due to war in Donbass Russian Railways would avoid Eastern Ukraine. The Zhuravka — Millerovo Railway bypassing the Ukrainian territory became operational in August 2017. It has 122.5 km double-track, 25 kV 50 Hz, maximum speed of 160 km/h, cost 56 billion RUB. The decision was taken against the background of the conflict in Ukraine to ensure security of passengers and cargo transportation. Long-distance trains will stop running through the station in this connection. By December 2017 the Russian Railways had switched all trains traveling southwards to the new Zhuravka-Millerovo line to circumvent Ukraine.

References 

Railway stations in Rostov Oblast
Railway stations in the Russian Empire opened in 1871
Cultural heritage monuments of regional significance in Rostov Oblast